is a region comprising the middle third of Fukushima Prefecture, Japan. It is sandwiched between the regions of Aizu to the west and Hamadōri to the east. The principal cities of the area are Kōriyama and the prefecture's capital, Fukushima.

References

 

Geography of Fukushima Prefecture
Tōhoku region